The Local Government (Dublin) Act 1930 is an Act of the Oireachtas (Irish parliament) which altered the administration of County Dublin and Dublin City.

Provisions
Amongst other matters, it provided for:
 the abolition of the urban districts of Pembroke and Rathmines and Rathgar and their inclusion within the city limits;
 the abolition of urban districts of Dún Laoghaire, Blackrock, Dalkey, Killiney and Ballybrack, and the creation as their successor of the borough of Dún Laoghaire;
 the transfer, from 1 April 1931, of territory from the county to the city, termed the "added rural areas", including Drumcondra, Glasnevin, Donnybrook and Terenure;
 the abolition of rural districts in County Dublin (which had been abolished elsewhere under the Local Government Act 1925.

References

External links
Dublin Historic Maps: Dublin City historical limits, Between 1840 and 1953
Dublin Historic Maps: Dublin Townships and Urban Districts, between 1847 and 1930

1930 in Irish law
Acts of the Oireachtas of the 1930s
Local government in the Republic of Ireland
Politics of Dublin (city)
Politics of County Dublin